Malik Muhammad Ahmad Khan is a Pakistani politician who was a Member of the Provincial Assembly of the Punjab, from 2002 to 2007, from May 2013 to May 2018 and again from August 2018 till January 2023.

Early life and education
He was born on 29 November 1971 in Kasur. to Malik Muhammad Ali Khan. His father, served as Member Punjab Assembly during 1972–77; as Senator during 1985–94; and as Deputy Chairman Senate during 1986–88.

He has the degree of Bachelor of Laws (Hons.) which he received in 1998 from University of Buckingham.

Political career
He was elected to the Provincial Assembly of the Punjab as a candidate of Pakistan Muslim League (Q) (PML-Q) from Constituency PP-179 (Kasur-V) in 2002 Pakistani general election. He received 21,728 votes and defeated an independent candidate, Naveed Hashim Rizvi.

He announced to join Pakistan Muslim League (Nawaz) (PML-N) in January 2012.

He was re-elected to the Provincial Assembly of the Punjab as a candidate of PML-N from Constituency PP-179 (Kasur-V) in 2013 Pakistani general election. He received 45,012 votes and defeated Malik Khurram Saleem, a candidate of Pakistan Peoples Party (PPP).

He was re-elected to Provincial Assembly of the Punjab as a candidate of PML-N from Constituency PP-176 (Kasur-III) in 2018 Pakistani general election.

He is also a member of  Special Committee No.3, Public Accounts Committee-II in the Provincial Assembly of Punjab.

References

Living people
1971 births
Punjab MPAs 2002–2007
Punjab MPAs 2013–2018
Pakistan Muslim League (Q) MPAs (Punjab)
Pakistan Muslim League (N) MPAs (Punjab)
Alumni of the University of Buckingham
Punjab MPAs 2018–2023